"She's Got All the Friends That Money Can Buy" is the first single released from Chumbawamba's album WYSIWYG. The song's lyrics describe a wealthy socialite who's benefited from her parents' wealth. Upon its release, the song received mixed reviews from critics and was generally unsuccessful, failing to enter the UK Singles Chart or the Billboard Hot 100 and receiving very little airplay. The song's B-side, "Passenger List for Doomed Flight #1721", was subject to controversy upon its release, due to its lyrics' criticism of a number of prominent social figures.

The song's introduction samples an audio clip from the American cable barker channel, Sneak Prevue.

Reception

Critical
The song was met with mixed reviews from critics upon its release. CMJ New Music Monthly, in their review of the song's parent album, described the track as "entertaining" but "ham-fisted." Rolling Stone, although highly critical of the song's parent album, praised the lyric "you can buy your friends but I'll hate you for free."

Commercial
The song was commercially unsuccessful, failing to enter the UK Singles Chart nor the Billboard Hot 100. The song received very little airplay upon its release. BBC Radio 1 considered the original version of the song "too pop" to receive airplay, so a second version of the song was recorded and released by former Eurovision Song Contest entrants and fellow West Yorkshire band Black Lace. The latter version is available from Chumbawamba's website for download.

Music video
A music video was released to promote the single. It depicts all six band members performing in front of a white background.

B-side
The B-side, "Passenger List for Doomed Flight #1721", was extremely controversial upon its release due to its subject matter: it called out, by name, a number of public figures (real and fictitious) of whom the group disapproved. Some of these included Courtney Love, Bill Gates, Bill Clinton, Tony Blair, Ally McBeal, Rupert Murdoch, and Bono. Following the song's release, many DJs threatened to remove the group from rotation. Regarding the controversy, vocalist Alice Nutter told MTV that "I'm always shocked by what causes controversy [...] All you have to do is write a song that's not a love song. People pretend they're absolutely stopped dead by a song that waves bye-bye to Bono. It's just pop music."

Track listings
US CD single (Republic, 2000)
 "She's Got All the Friends That Money Can Buy (Radio Edit)"
 "She's Got All the Friends That Money Can Buy (Album Version)"

European CD single (EMI, 2000)
 "She's Got All the Friends That Money Can Buy (Single Edit)"
 "Just a Form of Music"
 "Lest We Forget" (featuring John Jones from Oysterband on vocal)
 "Passenger List for Doomed Flight #1721"

Release history

References

External links
 Download the B-side and the Black Lace version from the band's official website.

Chumbawamba songs
2000 singles
EMI Records singles
2000 songs
Songs against capitalism
Songs about socialites